Chryseobacterium oleae is a bacterium from the genus Chryseobacterium which has been isolated from the rhizosphere of the olive tree Olea europaea in Seville in Spain. Chryseobacterium oleae can promote the plant growth.

References

Further reading

External links
Type strain of Chryseobacterium oleae at BacDive -  the Bacterial Diversity Metadatabase

oleae
Bacteria described in 2014